The following outline is provided as an overview of and topical guide to genetics:

Genetics – science of genes, heredity, and variation in living organisms. Genetics deals with the molecular structure and function of genes, and gene behavior in  context of a cell or organism (e.g. dominance and epigenetics),  patterns of inheritance from parent to offspring, and  gene distribution, variation and change in populations.

Introduction to genetics 

 Introduction to genetics
 Genetics
 Chromosome
 DNA
 Genetic diversity
 Genetic drift
 Genetic variation
 Genome
 Heredity
 Mutation
 Nucleotide
 RNA
 Introduction to evolution
 Evolution
 Modern evolutionary synthesis
 Transmutation of species
 Natural selection
 Extinction
 Adaptation
 Polymorphism (biology)
 Gene flow
 Biodiversity
 Biogeography
 Phylogenetic tree
 Taxonomy (biology)
 Mendelian inheritance
 Molecular evolution

Branches of genetics 
 Classical genetics
 Developmental genetics
 Conservation genetics
 Ecological genetics
 Evolutionary genetics
 Genetic engineering
 Metagenics
 Genetic epidemiology
 Archaeogenetics
 Archaeogenetics of the Near East
 Genetics of intelligence
 Genetic testing
 Genomics
 Human genetics
 Human evolutionary genetics
 Human mitochondrial genetics
 Medical genetics
 Microbial genetics
 Molecular genetics
 Neurogenetics
 Population genetics
 Plant genetics
 Psychiatric genetics
 Quantitative genetics
 Statistical genetics

Multi-disciplinary fields that include genetics 

 Evolutionary anthropology

History of genetics 

History of genetics

Natural history of genetics 

 History of molecular evolution
 Cladistics
 Transitional fossil
 Extinction event
 Timeline of the evolutionary history of life

History of the science of genetics 

History of genetics
 Ancient Concepts of Heredity
 Experiments on Plant Hybridization
 History of evolutionary thought
 History of genetic engineering
 History of genomics
 History of paleontology
 History of plant systematics
 Neanderthal genome project
 Timeline of paleontology

General genetics concepts 

 Molecules
 amino acids
 Nucleobase
 Adenine
 Cytosine
 Guanine
 Thymine
 Uracil
 Adenovirus
 Antibody
 Bacteria
 Codon
 Deoxyribonucleic acid (DNA)
 Messenger RNA
 mRNA
 Enzyme
 Exon
 Intron
 nucleotide
 allele
 animal model
 antisense
 apoptosis
 autosomal dominant
 autosome
 bacterial artificial chromosome (BAC)
 base pair
 birth defect
 bone marrow transplantation
 cancer
 candidate gene
 carcinoma
 carrier
 cDNA library
 cell
 centimorgan
 centromere
 chromosome
 chromosomal translocation
 cloning
 congenital disorder
 contig
 craniosynostosis
 cystic fibrosis
 cytogenetic map
 deletion
 diabetes mellitus
 diploid
 DNA replication
 DNA sequencing
 dominant
 double helix
 duplication
 electrophoresis
 fibroblasts
 fluorescence in situ hybridization (FISH)
 gene
 gene amplification
 gene expression
 gene library
 gene mapping
 gene pool
 gene therapy
 gene transfer
 genetic code
 ATGC
 genetic counseling
 genetic linkage
 genetic map
 genetic marker
 genetic screening
 genome
 genotype
 germ line
 haploid
 haploinsufficiency
 hematopoietic stem cell
 heterozygous
 highly conserved sequence
 holoprosencephaly
 homologous recombination
 homozygous
 human artificial chromosome (HAC)
 Human Genome Project
 human immunodeficiency virus (HIV) 
 acquired immunodeficiency syndrome (AIDS)
 hybridization
 immunotherapy
 in situ hybridization
 inherited
 insertion
 intellectual property rights
 Jurassic Park (genetics of)
 karyotype
 knockout
 leukemia
 List of human genetic disorders
 locus
 LOD score
 lymphocyte
 malformation
 Gene mapping
 marker
 melanoma
 Mendel, Johann (Gregor)
 Mendelian inheritance
 Metaphase
 microarray technology
 microsatellite
 mitochondrial DNA
 monosomy
 mouse model
 multiple endocrine neoplasia, type 1
  MEN1)
 mutation
 non-coding DNA
 non-directiveness
 nonsense mutation
 Northern blot
 Nucleic acid sequence
 nucleus
 oligo
 oncogene
 oncovirus
 p53
 Particulate inheritance theory
 patent
 pedigree
 peptide
 phenotype
 physical map
 polydactyly
 polymerase chain reaction (PCR)
 polymorphism
 positional cloning
 primary immunodeficiency
 primer
 probe
 promoter
 pronucleus
 protease
 protein
 pseudogene
 recessive
 recombinant DNA
 repressor
 restriction enzymes
 restriction fragment length polymorphism (RFLP)
 retrovirus
 ribonucleic acid (RNA)
 ribosome
 risk communication
 sequence-tagged site (STS)
 sex chromosome
 sex-linked
 shotgun sequencing
 single-nucleotide polymorphisms (SNPs)
 somatic cells
 Southern blot
 spectral karyotype (SKY)
 substitution
 suicide gene
 syndrome
 technology transfer
 transgenic
 trisomy
 tumor suppressor gene
 vector
 Western blot
 yeast artificial chromosome (YAC)

Genetic Modification 

 Genetic engineering
 Genetically modified organism
 Genetically modified food
 Genetically modified crops
 Norman Borlaug

Genetic research and Darwinism 

 DNA sequencing
 Medical genetics
 Genomics
 Evolutionary ideas of the Renaissance and Enlightenment
 On the Origin of Species
 Charles Darwin
 The eclipse of Darwinism

Concepts of Evolution 

 Common descent
 Evidence of common descent
 Speciation
 Co-operation (evolution)
 Adaptive radiation
 Coevolution
 Divergent evolution
 Convergent evolution
 Parallel evolution
 Evolutionary developmental biology
 Evolutionary biology
 Evolutionary history of life
 Human evolution
 Evolutionary taxonomy

Geneticists

Classical geneticists

 Gregor Mendel
 Hugo de Vries
 William Bateson
 Thomas Hunt Morgan
 Alfred Sturtevant
 Ronald Fisher
 Frederick Griffith
 Jean Brachet
 Edward Lawrie Tatum
 George Wells Beadle

DNA era geneticists

Oswald Theodore Avery
Colin McLeod
Erwin Chargaff
Barbara McClintock
James Watson
Francis Crick

Genomics era geneticists

Francis Collins
Walter Fiers
Eric Lander
Kary Banks Mullis
Lap-Chee Tsui
Frederick Sanger

Genetics-related organizations 

 List of genetics research organizations

See also 

 Outline of biochemistry
 Outline of biotechnology

References

External links 

Genetics
Genetics